Grimlord is a Polish heavy metal band from Wrocław, formed in 1999.

Members

Current members
 Bartosz Źrebiec – guitar, vocals
 Rafał Krent – bass
 Kacper Stachowiak – drums

Former members
 Bartosz Źrebiec – guitar
 Jacek Bagiński – drums

Discography
 Nocna Wizyta (CD Demo, 2003)
 Zaćmienie (CD single, 2005)
 Blood Runneth Over (2007)
 Dolce Vita Sath An As (2009)
 V-Column (Legacy Records, 2012)

References

External links
 
 Legacy Records

Polish melodic death metal musical groups
Musical groups established in 1999
Polish thrash metal musical groups
Musical quartets
1999 establishments in Poland
Organisations based in Wrocław